The 178th Massachusetts General Court, consisting of the Massachusetts Senate and the Massachusetts House of Representatives, met in 1993 and 1994 during the governorship of Bill Weld. William Bulger served as president of the Senate and Charles Flaherty served as speaker of the House.

Notable legislation included the Massachusetts Education Reform Act of 1993.

Senators

Representatives

See also
 103rd United States Congress
 List of Massachusetts General Courts

References

Further reading

External links
 
 
 
 
  (1964-1994)

Political history of Massachusetts
Massachusetts legislative sessions
massachusetts
1993 in Massachusetts
massachusetts
1994 in Massachusetts